William Kurlish (August 15, 1913 – March 24, 2000) is a former professional football player and engineer.

Early life
Kurlish moved to Delaware County as a teenager and attended Ridley High School. 
At Ridley, he was a member of the track and football teams.

College
Kurlish earned a scholarship to the University of Pennsylvania and completed a bachelor's degree in electrical engineering.

Personal life
Kurlish had one daughter, three brothers, five sisters, and one granddaughter. Golf was one of his hobbies.

References

External links
1937 NFL Draft Listing | Pro-Football-Reference.com

Penn Quakers football players
Brooklyn Dodgers (NFL) players
2000 deaths
American electrical engineers
Players of American football from Philadelphia
People from Delaware County, Pennsylvania
1913 births
Engineers from Pennsylvania
20th-century American engineers
Ridley High School alumni